NCCS may refer to:
 National Cancer Centre Singapore, a Cancer specialist medical centre in Singapore
 National Catholic Community Service
 National Center for Charitable Statistics
 National Center for Computational Sciences, at Oak Ridge National Laboratory
 National Center for Constitutional Studies, American conservative organization
 National Centre For Cell Science, University of Pune, India
 National Coalition for Cancer Survivorship, American cancer survivor advocacy organization
 National College of Computer Studies, college under Tribhuvan University in Nepal
 New Canaan Country School, a K-9 school in New Canaan, Connecticut
 New Consumer Classification System, a categorization system for Indian consumers developed to replace the SEC Classification
 North County Christian School, K-12 Christian school in Florissant, Missouri
 North Cow Creek School, K-8 public school in Palo Cedro, California

See also 

NCC (disambiguation)